Cora guajalitensis is a species of basidiolichen in the family Hygrophoraceae. Found in Ecuador, it was formally described as a new species in 2016 by Robert Lücking, Javier Robayo, and Manuela Dal Forno. The specific epithet guajalitensis refers to the type locality in the Río Guajalito Protected Forest in Pichincha Province. The lichen is only known to occur at this location, where it grows on the ground in association with other lichens and mosses.

References

guajalitensis
Lichen species
Lichens described in 2016
Lichens of Ecuador
Taxa named by Robert Lücking
Basidiolichens